Fabiano Donato Alves (born 1 December 1994) is a Brazilian professional footballer who plays as a defensive midfielder for Indian 2nd division club Rajasthan United FC.

Career
Fabiano was born in São Felipe, Brazil.

Fabiano joined Septemvri on 14 January 2018. He completed his debut for the team on 17 February 2018 in the first league match for the year, against Etar Veliko Tarnovo.

On 5 August 2021, he joined Nitra in Slovakia.

References

External links
 

1994 births
Sportspeople from Bahia
Living people
Brazilian footballers
Association football midfielders
Sociedade Esportiva Palmeiras players
Clube Atlético Bragantino players
Sport Club Corinthians Paulista players
Associação Atlética Flamengo players
Esporte Clube Tigres do Brasil players
Londrina Esporte Clube players
Boa Esporte Clube players
Volta Redonda FC players
FC Septemvri Sofia players
FC St. Gallen players
Clube Esportivo Aimoré players
FC Nitra players
Campeonato Brasileiro Série B players
First Professional Football League (Bulgaria) players
Swiss Super League players
Brazilian expatriate footballers
Expatriate footballers in Bulgaria
Brazilian expatriate sportspeople in Bulgaria
Expatriate footballers in Slovakia
Brazilian expatriate sportspeople in Slovakia